The Ritual is a 2017 British horror film that follows four friends who take a hiking trip into a Swedish forest and encounter an ancient evil. The film is directed by David Bruckner and written by Joe Barton, who adapted the 2011 novel The Ritual by Adam Nevill. The film stars Rafe Spall, Arsher Ali, Robert James-Collier, and Sam Troughton.

The Ritual had its world premiere at the 2017 Toronto International Film Festival on 8 September 2017, and was released in the United Kingdom on 13 October 2017, by eOne.

Plot 

Five friends—Phil, Dom, Hutch, Luke, and Rob—meet at a pub and discuss plans for a group holiday. Rob suggests hiking in Sweden, but gets rebuffed. Afterward, Luke and Rob leave to purchase alcohol, but interrupt a robbery in progress. Luke hides while the thieves harass Rob for his valuables. Torn with indecision over how to intervene, Luke continues to hide, and the thieves kill Rob for not giving them his wedding ring.

Six months later, the remaining four embark on a hiking trip along the Kungsleden in northern Sweden in Rob's memory. At the end of the first day, they set up a picture of Rob, some candles, and some mementos. Each take a drink out of a flask, and Hutch pours the rest out in Rob's memory, before replacing the lid to the flask. The next morning, they start again early when woken by a sudden strong rain, and the flask can be seen with no lid. Later that day, Dom injures his knee. Hutch suggests they cut through the forest rather than use the longer marked trail in the hopes of sparing Dom further suffering. Upon entering the forest, however, the group encounters strange phenomena, including a gutted elk hanging from several branches and strange symbols carved in the trees. As night falls, a torrential rainstorm forces them to find shelter. They come upon an abandoned cabin, so they break in and stay for the night. Inside, they find necklaces bearing similar symbols and a statue of a decapitated human torso made of twigs, with antlers for hands and decomposed human forearms and hands for feet. During the night, Luke has a nightmare about the robbery. The next morning, the group awake to find Luke's chest bleeding from strange puncture wounds and a naked Phil praying to the statue, all of them having had nightmares. Disturbed by their unconscious actions, the group tries to find a way out. While discerning their location, Luke spots a large figure amongst the trees, but Dom doubts him. In their ensuing argument, Dom calls Luke a coward for letting Rob die to save himself.

Later that night, Luke is having another nightmare about the robbery, and is awakened by Phil's screams. He comes out of his tent and finds Hutch's tent empty and partially collapsed. The remaining three men rush deeper into the woods to search for him, but by dawn, they realize that they are lost and unable to locate their campsite. While continuing their search without their supplies, they find Hutch gutted and impaled on tree branches. After giving him an impromptu burial, they continue on. Later, Phil is suddenly dragged away by an unseen creature. Despite realising the creature has been stalking them the entire time, Luke and Dom have little choice but to make a run for it. As the creature gives chase, they find a torch-lined path leading to a small settlement and rush into a cottage to hide. After they get inside they are knocked unconscious.

When they awake, they find themselves restrained in a cellar. An elderly woman enters and inspects Luke's chest wounds, revealing she bears a similar marking on her chest. On her way out, she orders two men to take Dom upstairs. A younger woman enters and explains that preparations are being made for a sacrifice. Sometime later, a beaten Dom is returned to the basement. He tells Luke that he is to be sacrificed to the creature, urging him to escape and destroy the village before he too is sacrificed. Desperate to escape, Luke breaks his thumb and partially frees himself from his restraints as Dom is tied up outside by the townsfolk. Amidst the ritual, Dom has a vision of his wife emerging from the forest, not realizing it is the creature until right before it picks him up and impales him on a nearby tree. Some time later, the young woman comes back. When Luke asks about the creature, she explains that it is a Jötunn named "Moder," an ancient god-like entity and an offspring of Loki that the cult provides sacrifices to in return for immortality. Luke has been chosen and is to either worship Moder or be sacrificed.

After she leaves, Luke fully frees himself and ventures upstairs. Armed with a torch, he finds a twisted congregation of mummified worshipers that begin to move and sets them alight, burning the cabin, and attracting Moder. She picks up the young woman. Luke finds a hunting rifle and heads downstairs, running into and killing a follower before taking another man's axe. The enraged Jötunn kills the young woman while Luke shoots at her and escapes. She pursues him, crippling his mind with hallucinations of Rob's death before catching and forcing him to his knees, offering him a chance to submit. Luke refuses before striking her with the axe, briefly incapacitating her. Following hallucinatory sign-posts and rays of sunlight, he emerges in an open field. Unable to leave the forest, Moder roars in anger while Luke shouts back in triumph before heading towards a paved road that shows an approaching car.

Cast 
 Rafe Spall as Luke 
 Arsher Ali as Phil 
 Robert James-Collier as Hutch
 Sam Troughton as Dom
 Paul Reid as Robert
 Maria Erwolter as The Host
 Hilary Reeves as The Curate 
 Francesca Mula as The Witch
 Matthew Needham as Junkie

Production 
The film was shot on location in the Carpathian Mountains of Romania.

The film's score was composed by David Bruckner's long-time friend and frequent collaborator, Ben Lovett. Lovett also scored Bruckner's 2007 film The Signal and 2020's The Night House.

Release
The Ritual premiered in September 2017 at the Toronto International Film Festival, where its international distribution rights were sold to Netflix for $4.75 million. The film was theatrically released in the United Kingdom by eOne Films on 13 October 2017 and grossed over $1 million during its run. It was later released to Netflix on 9 February 2018.

Critical reception
On review aggregator website Rotten Tomatoes, the film holds an approval rating of 74% based on 96 reviews, and an average rating of 6.1/10. The website's critical consensus states: "Director David Bruckner makes evocative use of the Scandinavian setting and a dedicated cast to deliver a handsome — if familiar — horror story." On Metacritic, the film has a weighted average score of 57 out of 100, based on 18 critics, indicating "mixed or average reviews".
Katie Walsh of the Los Angeles Times praised the film and said that it was "Efficient and highly effective in its style, relying on sound, creepy production design, and the men's own fear and misjudgments to create the sense of pervasive doom." RogerEbert.com writer Simon Abrams scored the film a 2/4, saying "The most disappointing kind of bad horror movie: the kind that's too smart to be this dumb." Kyle Kohner of The Playlist gave the film a negative review, saying "David Bruckner had all the ingredients for a horror masterpiece - deceptively scenic wilderness shots, great character camaraderie, dreadful atmosphere/setting- but The Ritual winds up a missed opportunity."

References

External links 

2010s monster movies
2010s supernatural horror films
2017 films
2017 horror films
Folk horror films
British monster movies
Entertainment One films
Films about cults
Films about human sacrifice
Films about witchcraft
Films based on British novels
Films based on horror novels
Films based on Norse mythology
Films directed by David Bruckner
Films set in forests
Films set in Sweden
Films shot in Romania
2010s English-language films
British supernatural horror films
2017 directorial debut films
2010s British films